Rabbi Eli Stefansky was raised in New York and Bnei Brak, Israel. He is a graduate of some of the most prestigious yeshivos both in Israel and the United States. He continued his studies after his marriage, and subsequently entered the real estate business.

His Daf Yomi shiur is streamed live each weekday morning and on Saturdays after the end of Sabbath, and is recorded and uploaded to many streaming platforms. The shiur is watched live in person and over the internet by hundreds of students from around the world, and thousands more watch the recording later on in the day.  Students email Reb Stefansky with questions and comments, of which he reads selected emails during subsequent shiurim.

Biography

Early years

Daf Yomi
For more than 7 years, Stefansky gave a daf yomi shiur in Chicago to a small group of students.

When he moved to Israel he gave a weekly shiur from his home, where he reviewed the entire week's daf yomi in about 45 minutes. This gave him the idea to create his well known daily 8 Minute Daf program. By January 2020, nearly 15,000 people were receiving the daily 8 minute daf clip by WhatsApp and watching it for prep or review.

After moving to Israel, he was encouraged to begin giving a full daily daf shiur, The space he was using to give that shiur was quickly filled, and Stefansky started plans to develop a building dedicated to the giving of Daf Yom shiurim.

Merkaz Daf Yomi
Reb Stefansky's dedicated building is known as "Mercaz Daf Yomi" in Ramat Bet Shemesh. The building was ready and opened in time for the 14th daf Yomi Cycle which began on January 4, 2020. It seats approximately 100 students. Stefansky describes it as a ″Mancave for Torah.″

Songs
Several songs were composed and recorded about the MDY phenomenon including Ki Ner Mitzvah by Rabbi Nachman Seltzer, himself once a singer for the Miami Boys Choir. Rabbi Seltzer also composed and sung It's About The Yomi

Dovid Adress, a student of Stefansky, composed Where Do You Do Daf and It's All About The Yomi, in which Adress refers to Stefansky as ″The greatest Maggid Shiur in daf history.″

See also
Mercaz Daf Yomi YouTube Channel

Mercaz Daf Yomi Website

References

External links
Ami Magazine Interview
Artscroll Interview
Meaningful People Interview